The Occupational Safety and Health Review Commission (OSHRC) is an independent federal agency created under the Occupational Safety and Health Act to decide contests of citations or penalties resulting from OSHA inspections of American work places.

See also
 Title 29 of the Code of Federal Regulations

References

Independent agencies of the United States government
Occupational safety and health organizations